All Milan residents who are at least 18 years old and hold an EU citizenship are eligible to vote for the mayor and the City Council, as well as for the president and the Council of the Municipality where they reside.

Since 1993 Italian mayors are directly elected. In all the cities with a population higher than 15,000 the voters express a choice for a mayor-candidate and/or for a party or civic list, not necessarily linked to the same mayor-candidate (voto disgiunto). If no mayor-candidate receives an absolute majority, the top two candidates go to a runoff election (ballottaggio) after two weeks. The City Council and Municipalities Councils elections are based on a proportional system with preferences: for each list, the candidates with the most preferences are elected proportionally to the seats assigned to the list, with the lists supporting the elected mayor being granted around 60% of the total seats to guarantee governability.

Elections are scheduled every five years, usually between 15 April and 15 June. The last election was held in 2021.

Elections during the Kingdom of Italy (1861–1946)

City Council election, 1889
The election took place on 10 November 1889.

Sunday 10 November 1889

City Council election, 1895
The election took place on 10 February 1895.

Sunday 10 February 1895

City Council election, 1899
The election took place on 11 June 1899.

Sunday 11 June 1899

City Council election, 1905
The election took place on 29 January 1905.

Sunday 29 January 1905

City Council election, 1911
The election took place on 22 January 1911.

It was the first municipal election which involved the complete renewal of the City Council after six years. Elections which brought to a partial renewal of the City Council were held in 1907 and in 1910.

Sunday 22 January 1911.

City Council election, 1914

The election took place on 14 June 1914.

It was the first municipal election held by universal manhood suffrage. Changes made by the 1912 electoral reform widened the voting franchise to include all literate men aged 21 or over who had served in the armed forces. For those over 30 the literacy requirement was abolished. The political debate on the enlargement of the right to vote had begun in the early years of the new century. The Socialists, in fact, but also the Radicals and the Republicans, had long demanded the introduction of universal manhood suffrage, necessary in a modern liberal democracy. The Italian Prime Minister Giovanni Giolitti declared himself in favor of universal male suffrage, believing that the extension of the franchise would bring more conservative rural voters to the polls as well as drawing votes from grateful socialists. But after the 1913 national election, became clear that the universal male suffrage, contrary to Giolitti's opinions, would have destabilized the entire political establishment: the "mass parties" were the ones who benefitted from the new electoral system.

In a huge blow for the traditional moderate and liberal groups which had dominated both national and milanese political system for more than 50 years, the socialists were able to win the super-majority of seats in the City Council granted by the local electoral law for the first time in history and their leader, Emilio Caldara, became the first socialist Mayor of a major Italian city.

Due to the mechanism of the majoritarian electoral system, which granted a representation in the City Council just for the majority party and for the party which came second in the election, both the radicals and the republicans didn't obtain a single seat.

Sunday 14 June 1914.

City Council election, 1920

Last election before the rise of the fascist regime took place on 7 November 1920.

The election was originally scheduled to take place in June 1918 but was postponed due to the First World War. In March 1919 Benito Mussolini had founded in Milan the political organization Fasci Italiani di Combattimento, which was incorporated in an ultra-conservative coalition formed also by the liberals and the nationalists led by Enrico Corradini, and other right-wing forces.

Despite the intense violent activity of the fascist paramilitary groups during the electoral campaign, the socialists were able to retain the majority in the City Council for a few votes.

Sunday 7 November 1920.

City Council election, 1922

The last democratic election after the rise of the fascist regime took place on 10 December 1922.

It was a snap election after two years of fascist death threats to the previous Socialist municipal councillors and the final removal of Mayor Angelo Filippetti by the Royal police under the accusation of a republican riot.

The Fasci Italiani di Combattimento incorporated an ultra-conservative coalition formed also by the liberals and the Italian People's Party, and other right-wing forces. Following the intense violent activity of the fascist paramilitary groups during the electoral campaign, the Centre-right coalition was able to gain the majority in the City Council face to the leftists forces which were divided by their leadership struggles.

Senator Luigi Mangiagalli became the new Mayor. In 1926 he volountarly dismissed following the introduction of the new system of fascist city Governors.

Sunday 10 December 1922.

Elections during the Italian Republic (since 1946)

City Council election, 1946

The first democratic election after the fall of fascism took place on 7 April 1946.

After the defeat of the Nazis forces on 25 April 1945, socialist politician Antonio Greppi had been appointed as Provisional Mayor by the National Liberation Committee (CLN) under approval of the United Nations military government. When the authority of the Italian government was restored on 1 January 1946, local elections were called in Northern Italy.

Proportional representation and Westminster system were the principles chosen to restore municipal democracy in Italy.

After the clear socialist victory, Greppi was confirmed Mayor by the City Council, and an executive board of municipal unity was formed: the alliance between PSIUP, DC and PCI ruled Milan as it ruled Italy at time.

Sunday 7 April 1946. Sources: La Stampa , Unimi , 1946–1955 Local Elections (Italian)

City Council election, 1951 
The second post-war election took place on 27 May 1951.

Political situation had deeply changed during the previous five years. A new social-democratic party had broken away from the Socialist Party, and the alliances of anti-fascist unity had ended both at national and at local level. The Communist Party had left the administration of Milan in 1949, as the remaining Socialist Party had moved to a position of abstention. Antonio Greppi had joined the social-democratic group and formed a new centrist alliance with the DC, the PLI and the PRI.

In 1951 Alcide De Gasperi's government changed the local electoral law to a block voting system, to ensure the leadership of its local administrations: two thirds of the seats would be ensured to the winning coalition, abolishing the proportional representation.

The centrist incumbent coalition obtained an absolute majority with 53% of suffrages, which was changed into a 66% of seats by the electoral mechanism. However Greppi, who had unsuccessfully called for a coalition of socialist unity between the PSDI and the PSI, lost the support of the DC. Virgilio Ferrari, a social-democratic activist, was elected Mayor on 25 June.

Sunday 27 May 1951. Sources: La Stampa , Unimi

City Council election, 1956
The election took place on 27 May 1956.

For this election there was a different electoral system: after Alcide De Gasperi's government had retired in 1953 the 1951-electoral law based on a block voting system, the previous electoral law was restored.

Christian Democracy obtained the 30% of suffrages, while the Socialist Party came second with the 20% of the votes, gaining 6% more than the 1951 election. Virgilio Ferrari was confirmed Mayor by the majority of the City Council.

Sunday 27 May 1956. Source: La Stampa

City Council election, 1960
The election took place on 6 November 1960.

This election was anticipated by the effect of a new law which ordered a new 4 years-term legislature.

Christian Democracy came again first with the 29% of suffrages. Gino Cassinis (PSDI) was elected Mayor by a large majority in the City Council. For the first time in ten years the Socialist Party entered again in the executive board of the city and a centre-left alliance was formed.

Sunday 6 November 1960. Source: La Stampa

City Council election, 1964

The election took place on 22 November 1964.

The election was characterized by the incredible surge of the centre-right Liberal Party, which obtained more than 21% of votes and managed to become for the first time the third party in a milanese municipal election. This exceptional growth of the liberals – and the contemporary defeat of the Socialist Party – can be explained by the poor economic results of the first centre-left national government and by the ability of the liberal leader Giovanni Malagodi to draw some votes from the Italian Social Movement, the Monarchist Party and especially Christian Democracy, whose electoral base was composed also by conservatives suspicious of the Socialists. Christian Democracy itself obtained just the 24% of suffrages, suffering a notable loss from the previous election.

Despite the huge loss by the left-wing parties, a center-left coalition was formed again and Pietro Bucalossi (PSDI), who succeeded Cassinis in February 1964, was confirmed Mayor by the majority of the City Council.

Sunday 22 November 1964. Source: La Stampa

City Council election, 1970
The election took place on 7 June 1970.

This election took place after six years from the last and simultaneously with the first regional elections of Lombardy.

Christian Democracy obtained the 26% of suffrages, while the Italian Communist Party came second with the 22% of the votes. However in 1967 the socialists had already been able to impose their own candidate for Mayor, succeeding in having elected Aldo Aniasi at the head of a centre-left coalition. After the municipal election, Aniasi was elected Mayor again by the majority of the City Council.

Sunday 7 June 1970. Source: La Stampa

City Council election, 1975

The election took place on 15 June 1975.

Similarly to the national vote, the Italian Communist Party became for the first time in history the first party with the 30% of the votes. This extraordinary result led to the birth of the first red-giunta in the history of the city: the new coalition was formed by the leftist Socialist and Communist Party, while Aldo Aniasi was reconfirmed Mayor. In 1976, after Aniasi's resignation, the socialist Carlo Tognoli was elected Mayor.

A notable fact in the election was the surge of the post-fascist Italian Social Movement, which became the fourth party with the 7% of the votes.

Sunday 15 June 1975. Source: La Stampa

City Council election, 1980
The election took place on 8 June 1980.

For the second time the Italian Communist Party was the first party with the 26% of the votes.

Sunday 8 June 1980. Source: La Stampa

City Council election, 1985
The election took place on 12 May 1985.

Another time the Italian Communist Party was narrowly confirmed as the first party in the city with the 24% of the votes. Despite it came first, the Communist Party didn't have enough seats in the City Council to confirm again a left-wing with the Socialist Party, which instead decided to form a new centre-left majority with the Christian Democracy and other small centrist parties.

Carlo Tognoli was reconfirmed Mayor, but resigned in December 1986.

Sunday 12 May 1985. Source: La Stampa

City Council election, 1990

The election took place on 6 May 1990.

The election was characterized by a huge level of political fragmentation. Traditional parties suffered some considerable losses, while new-born movements gained some seats in the City Council and made very difficult the possibility to form a stable coalition to govern the city.

The newborn regionalist Lega Nord became the fourth party with the 13% of the votes.

Sunday 6 May 1990. Source: La Stampa

Mayoral and City Council election, 1993

Mayoral and City Council election, 1997

Mayoral and City Council election, 2001

Mayoral and City Council election, 2006

Mayoral and City Council election, 2011

Mayoral and City Council election, 2016

Mayoral and City Council election, 2021

References

 
Milan
Milan
21st century in Milan